Stanley is a town in Gaston County, North Carolina, United States. The population was 3,556 at the 2010 census.

Geography
Stanley is located at  (35.358447, -81.096815).

The 28164 zip code for Stanley extends north into unincorporated land as far as the southwestern corner of Lake Norman in Lincoln County.

Demographics

2020 census

As of the 2020 United States census, there were 3,963 people, 1,395 households, and 1,032 families residing in the town.

2000 census
As of the census of 2000, there were 3,053 people, 1,201 households, and 887 families residing in the town. The population density was 1,327.2 people per square mile (512.5/km). There were 1,303 housing units at an average density of 566.4 per square mile (218.7/km). The racial makeup of the town was 89.42% White, 8.42% African American, 0.39% Native American, 0.46% Asian, 0.03% Pacific Islander, 0.66% other races, and 0.62% from two or more races. Hispanic or Latino of any race comprised 0.82% of the population [United States Census, 2000].

There were 1,201 households, out of which 35.5% had children under the age of 18 living with them, 55.7% were married couples living together, 14.7% had a female householder with no husband present, and 26.1% were non-families. 23.1% of all households were made up of individuals, and 8.7% had someone living alone who was 65 years of age or older. The average household size was 2.54 and the average family size was 2.99.

In the town, the population was spread out, with 26.6% under the age of 18, 7.7% from 18 to 24, 32.2% from 25 to 44, 22.0% from 45 to 64, and 11.5% who were 65 years of age or older. The median age was 36 years. For every 100 females, there were 93.6 males. For every 100 females age 18 and over, there were 87.0 males.

The median income for a household in the town was $35,867, and the median income for a family was $39,914. Males had a median income of $36,932 versus $21,178 for females. The per capita income for the town was $17,403. About 9.0% of families and 10.6% of the population were below the poverty line, including 10.6% of those under age 18 and 9.3% of those age 65 or over.

Education
Stanley has five public schools.
 Community Public Charter School
Kiser Elementary
 Springfield Elementary
 Stanley Middle School
 East Gaston High School

The Stanley Branch of the Gaston County Public Library system serves this community.

Notable people
 Ted Abernathy, major league baseball pitcher (1955–72), born in Stanley in 1933.

References

External links
 Town of Stanley official website
 Brevard Station Museum

Towns in Gaston County, North Carolina
Towns in North Carolina